West Lincoln High School (WLHS) is in Lincoln County, North Carolina, outside Lincolnton, North Carolina.  West Lincoln is a comprehensive four-year high school recognized as a School of Distinction and accredited by the Southern Association of Colleges and Schools. WLHS provides for student development through varied curricula, including Advanced Placement (AP) and honors courses. Lincoln County high schools utilize block scheduling. Students are enrolled in four 90-minute classes each semester. The academic year, which begins around August 25 and ends around the second week of June, is divided equally into two semesters and four grading periods.

Career-technical education
Career-technical education, a priority of the Lincoln County Board of Education, is provided at the high school and the Lincoln County School of Technology. LCST, a unique centralized educational center, serves as an extension of the four county high schools.  Students attend daily 90-minute classes during the 11th and 12th grades. Career-technical students may participate in apprenticeships, career internships, and earn college credits through articulation agreements with local institutions of higher learning. The Lincoln County Job-Ready System of career majors helps students relate academics to the real world and develop realistic career goals.

Spirit Week
West Lincoln hosts several events every year. Spirit Week is one of the most anticipated events of the school year. Spirit Week is held in the week of the homecoming football game. Every day has a different theme and the students are allowed to dress up for the day. There is always a pajama day, and at the end of the week, the day of the big game, is called "Rowdy Rebel" day. On Rowdy Rebel day, students wear their homecoming shirts and their best pair of overalls. On the morning of Rowdy Rebel day, West Lincoln hosts a "Tractor Parade". Students will sign up and drive their tractors to school. The parade is followed by a pep rally to celebrate homecoming.

Sports
West Lincoln sports teams include American football, baseball, men's and women's basketball, softball, wrestling, men's and women's tennis, men's soccer and women's soccer, men's and women's cross country and volleyball. All of these, with the exception of tennis, track, soccer and golf, have junior varsity and varsity teams.

Wrestling
The West Lincoln wrestling team has won four North Carolina High School Athletic Association (NCHSAA) dual team wrestling state championships. In 2000, West Lincoln won their first dual team state title in the 1A/2A class, posting a 31–1 overall record. In 2015, they won their second dual team state championship in the 2A class. In 2018 and 2019, West Lincoln won back-to-back 2A dual team state titles.

References

External links
West Lincoln High School Homepage

Public high schools in North Carolina
Schools in Lincoln County, North Carolina